Casizolu is a cow's milk cheese from Sardinia, made by the pasta filata method. It is listed in the Ark of Taste.

See also
Sardinian cuisine
Italian cuisine

References

Italian cheeses
Ark of Taste foods
Cuisine of Sardinia